The 1974 United States House of Representatives elections were elections for the United States House of Representatives on November 5, 1974, to elect members to serve in the 94th United States Congress. They occurred in the wake of the Watergate scandal, which had forced President Richard Nixon to resign in favor of Gerald Ford. This scandal, along with high inflation, allowed the Democrats to make large gains in the midterm elections, taking 48 seats from the Republicans (an additional seat was gained, for a net gain of 49, when Representative Joe Moakley from Massachusetts switched his party affiliation back to Democrat after winning his 1972 election as an independent), and increasing their majority above the two-thirds mark. Altogether, there were 93 freshmen representatives in the 94th Congress when it convened on January 3, 1975 (76 of them Democrats). Those elected to office that year later came to be known collectively as "Watergate Babies." The gain of 49 Democratic seats was the largest pickup by the party since 1958.

, this was the last time the Democrats gained 45 or more seats in a House election.

Overall results

Summary of the November 5, 1974, United States House of Representatives election results

Special elections 
These elections were for the remainder of the term ending January 3, 1975.

|-
! 
| John Saylor
|  | Republican
| 1952
|  | Incumbent died October 28, 1973.A special election was held February 25, 1974.Democratic gain.
| nowrap | 

|-
! 
| Gerald Ford
|  | Republican
| 1948
|  | Incumbent resigned December 6, 1973, to become Vice President of the United States.A special election was held February 18, 1974.Democratic gain.
| nowrap | 

|-
! 
| Bill Keating
|  | Republican
| 1970
|  | Incumbent resigned January 3, 1974, to take a position as president of The Cincinnati Enquirer.A special election was held March 5, 1974.Democratic gain.
| nowrap | 

|-
! 
| James Harvey
|  | Republican
| 1960
|  | Incumbent resigned January 31, 1974, to become judge for the United States District Court for the Eastern District of Michigan.A special election was held April 16, 1974.Democratic gain.
| nowrap | 

|-
! 
| Bill Mailliard
|  | Republican
| 1952
|  | Incumbent resigned March 5, 1974, to become United States Ambassador to the Organization of American States.A special election was held June 4, 1974.Democratic gain.
| nowrap | 

|-
! 
| Charles Teague
|  | Republican
| 1954
|  | Incumbent died January 1, 1974.A special election was held June 4, 1974.Republican hold.
| nowrap | 
|}

Alabama 

|-
! 
| Jack Edwards
|  | Republican
| 1964
| Incumbent re-elected.
| nowrap | 

|-
! 
| William Louis Dickinson
|  | Republican
| 1964
| Incumbent re-elected.
| nowrap | 

|-
! 
| William Flynt Nichols
|  | Democratic
| 1966
| Incumbent re-elected.
| nowrap | 

|-
! 
| Tom Bevill
|  | Democratic
| 1966
| Incumbent re-elected.
| nowrap | 

|-
! 
| Robert E. Jones Jr.
|  | Democratic
| 1947 
| Incumbent re-elected.
| nowrap | 

|-
! 
| John Hall Buchanan Jr.
|  | Republican
| 1964
| Incumbent re-elected.
| nowrap | 

|-
! 
| Walter Flowers
|  | Democratic
| 1968
| Incumbent re-elected.
| nowrap | 

|}

Alaska 

|-
! 
| Don Young
|  | Republican
| 1973 (special)
| Incumbent re-elected.
| nowrap | 

|}

Arizona 

|-
! 
| John Jacob Rhodes
|  | Republican
| 1952
| Incumbent re-elected.
| nowrap | 

|-
! 
| Mo Udall
|  | Democratic
| 1961 
| Incumbent re-elected.
| nowrap | 

|-
! 
| Sam Steiger
|  | Republican
| 1966
| Incumbent re-elected.
| nowrap | 

|-
! 
| John Bertrand Conlan
|  | Republican
| 1972
| Incumbent re-elected.
| nowrap | 

|}

Arkansas 

|-
! 
| William Vollie Alexander Jr.
|  | Democratic
| 1968
| Incumbent re-elected.
| nowrap | 

|-
! 
| Wilbur Mills
|  | Democratic
| 1938
| Incumbent re-elected.
| nowrap | 

|-
! 
| John Paul Hammerschmidt
|  | Republican
| 1966
| Incumbent re-elected.
| nowrap | 

|-
! 
| Ray Thornton
|  | Democratic
| 1972
| Incumbent re-elected.
| nowrap | 

|}

California 

|-
! 
| Harold T. Johnson
|  | Democratic
| 1958
| Incumbent re-elected.
| nowrap | 

|-
! 
| Donald H. Clausen
|  | Republican
| 1963 
| Incumbent re-elected.
| nowrap | 

|-
! 
| John E. Moss
|  | Democratic
| 1952
| Incumbent re-elected.
| nowrap | 

|-
! 
| Robert L. Leggett
|  | Democratic
| 1962
| Incumbent re-elected.
| nowrap | 

|-
! 
| John L. Burton
|  | Democratic
| 1974
| Incumbent re-elected.
| nowrap | 

|-
! 
| Phillip Burton
|  | Democratic
| 1964
| Incumbent re-elected.
| nowrap | 

|-
! 
| Jerome R. Waldie
|  | Democratic
| 1966
|  | Incumbent retired to run for Governor of California.New member elected.Democratic hold.
| nowrap | 

|-
! 
| Ron Dellums
|  | Democratic
| 1970
| Incumbent re-elected.
| nowrap | 

|-
! 
| Pete Stark
|  | Democratic
| 1972
| Incumbent re-elected.
| nowrap | 

|-
! 
| Don Edwards
|  | Democratic
| 1962
| Incumbent re-elected.
| nowrap | 

|-
! 
| Leo Ryan
|  | Democratic
| 1972
| Incumbent re-elected.
| nowrap | 

|-
! 
| Pete McCloskey
|  | Republican
| 1967 
| Incumbent re-elected.
| nowrap | 

|-
! 
| Charles S. Gubser
|  | Republican
| 1952
|  | Incumbent retired.New member elected.Democratic gain.
| nowrap | 

|-
! 
| John J. McFall
|  | Democratic
| 1956
| Incumbent re-elected.
| nowrap | 

|-
! 
| B. F. Sisk
|  | Democratic
| 1954
| Incumbent re-elected.
| nowrap | 

|-
! 
| Burt L. Talcott
|  | Republican
| 1962
| Incumbent re-elected.
| nowrap | 

|-
! 
| Bob Mathias
|  | Republican
| 1966
|  | Incumbent lost re-election.New member elected.Democratic gain.
| nowrap | 

|-
! 
| William M. Ketchum
|  | Republican
| 1972
| Incumbent re-elected.
| nowrap | 

|-
! 
| Robert J. Lagomarsino
|  | Republican
| 1974
| Incumbent re-elected.
| nowrap | 

|-
! 
| Barry Goldwater Jr.
|  | Republican
| 1969 
| Incumbent re-elected.
| nowrap | 

|-
! 
| James C. Corman
|  | Democratic
| 1960
| Incumbent re-elected.
| nowrap | 

|-
! 
| Carlos Moorhead
|  | Republican
| 1972
| Incumbent re-elected.
| nowrap | 

|-
! 
| Thomas M. Rees
|  | Democratic
| 1965 
| Incumbent re-elected.
| nowrap | 

|-
! 
| colspan=3  | None (District created)
|  | New seat.New member elected.Democratic gain.
| nowrap | 

|-
! 
| Edward R. Roybal
|  | Democratic
| 1962
| Incumbent re-elected.
| nowrap | 

|-
! 
| John H. Rousselot
|  | Republican
| 19601962 1970 
| Incumbent re-elected.
| nowrap | 

|-
! 
| Alphonzo E. Bell Jr.
|  | Republican
| 1960
| Incumbent re-elected.
| nowrap | 

|-
! 
| Yvonne Brathwaite Burke
|  | Democratic
| 1972
| Incumbent re-elected.
| nowrap | 

|-
! 
| Augustus Hawkins
|  | Democratic
| 1962
| Incumbent re-elected.
| nowrap | 

|-
! rowspan=2  | 
| George E. Danielson
|  | Democratic
| 1970
| Incumbent re-elected.
| rowspan=2 nowrap | 

|-
| Chet Holifield
|  | Democratic
| 1942
|  | Incumbent retired.Democratic loss.

|-
! 
| Charles H. Wilson
|  | Democratic
| 1962
| Incumbent re-elected.
| nowrap | 

|-
! 
| Glenn M. Anderson
|  | Democratic
| 1968
| Incumbent re-elected.
| nowrap | 

|-
! 
| Del M. Clawson
|  | Republican
| 1963 
| Incumbent re-elected.
| nowrap | 

|-
! 
| Craig Hosmer
|  | Republican
| 1952
|  | Incumbent retired.New member elected.Democratic gain.
| nowrap | 

|-
! 
| Victor Veysey
|  | Republican
| 1970
|  | Incumbent lost re-election.New member elected.Democratic gain.
| nowrap | 

|-
! 
| George Brown Jr.
|  | Democratic
| 19621970 1972
| Incumbent re-elected.
| nowrap | 

|-
! 
| Jerry Pettis
|  | Republican
| 1966
| Incumbent re-elected.
| nowrap | 

|-
! 
| Richard T. Hanna
|  | Democratic
| 1962
|  | Incumbent retired.New member elected.Democratic hold.
| nowrap | 

|-
! 
| Charles E. Wiggins
|  | Republican
| 1966
| Incumbent re-elected.
| nowrap | 

|-
! 
| Andrew J. Hinshaw
|  | Republican
| 1972
| Incumbent re-elected.
| nowrap | 

|-
! 
| Bob Wilson
|  | Republican
| 1952
| Incumbent re-elected.
| nowrap | 

|-
! 
| Lionel Van Deerlin
|  | Democratic
| 1962
| Incumbent re-elected.
| nowrap | 

|-
! 
| Clair Burgener
|  | Republican
| 1972
| Incumbent re-elected.
| nowrap | 

|}

Colorado 

|-
! 
| Patricia Schroeder
|  | Democratic
| 1972
| Incumbent re-elected.
| nowrap | 

|-
! 
| Donald G. Brotzman
|  | Republican
| 19621964 1966
|  | Incumbent lost re-election.New member elected.Democratic gain.
| nowrap | 

|-
! 
| Frank Evans
|  | Democratic
| 1964
| Incumbent re-elected.
| nowrap | 

|-
! 
| James Paul Johnson
|  | Republican
| 1972
| Incumbent re-elected.
| nowrap | 

|-
! 
| William L. Armstrong
|  | Republican
| 1972
| Incumbent re-elected.
| nowrap | 

|}

Connecticut 

|-
! 
| William R. Cotter
|  | Democratic
| 1970
| Incumbent re-elected.
| nowrap | 

|-
! 
| Robert H. Steele
|  | Republican
| 1970
|  | Incumbent retired to run for Governor of Connecticut.New member elected.Democratic gain.
| nowrap | 

|-
! 
| Robert Giaimo
|  | Democratic
| 1958
| Incumbent re-elected.
| nowrap | 

|-
! 
| Stewart McKinney
|  | Republican
| 1970
| Incumbent re-elected.
| nowrap | 

|-
! 
| Ronald A. Sarasin
|  | Republican
| 1972
| Incumbent re-elected.
| nowrap | 

|-
! 
| Ella T. Grasso
|  | Democratic
| 1970
|  | Incumbent retired to run for Governor of Connecticut.New member elected.Democratic hold.
| nowrap | 

|}

Delaware 

|-
! 
| Pierre S. du Pont IV
|  | Republican
| 1970
| Incumbent re-elected.
| nowrap | 

|}

Florida 

|-
! 
| Bob Sikes
|  | Democratic
| 19401944 1974
| Incumbent re-elected.
| nowrap | 

|-
! 
| Don Fuqua
|  | Democratic
| 1962
| Incumbent re-elected.
| nowrap | 

|-
! 
| Charles Edward Bennett
|  | Democratic
| 1948
| Incumbent re-elected.
| nowrap | 

|-
! 
| Bill Chappell
|  | Democratic
| 1968
| Incumbent re-elected.
| nowrap | 

|-
! 
| Bill Gunter
|  | Democratic
| 1972
|  | Incumbent retired to run for U.S. senator.New member elected.Republican gain.
| nowrap | 

|-
! 
| Bill Young
|  | Republican
| 1970
| Incumbent re-elected.
| nowrap | 

|-
! 
| Sam M. Gibbons
|  | Democratic
| 1962
| Incumbent re-elected.
| nowrap | 

|-
! 
| James A. Haley
|  | Democratic
| 1952
| Incumbent re-elected.
| nowrap | 

|-
! 
| Louis Frey Jr.
|  | Republican
| 1968
| Incumbent re-elected.
| nowrap | 

|-
! 
| Skip Bafalis
|  | Republican
| 1972
| Incumbent re-elected.
| nowrap | 

|-
! 
| Paul Rogers
|  | Democratic
| 1954
| Incumbent re-elected.
| nowrap | 

|-
! 
| J. Herbert Burke
|  | Republican
| 1966
| Incumbent re-elected.
| nowrap | 

|-
! 
| William Lehman
|  | Democratic
| 1972
| Incumbent re-elected.
| nowrap | 

|-
! 
| Claude Pepper
|  | Democratic
| 1962
| Incumbent re-elected.
| nowrap | 

|-
! 
| Dante Fascell
|  | Democratic
| 1954
| Incumbent re-elected.
| nowrap | 

|}

Georgia 

|-
! 
| Ronald "Bo" Ginn
|  | Democratic
| 1972
| Incumbent re-elected.
| nowrap | 

|-
! 
| Dawson Mathis
|  | Democratic
| 1970
| Incumbent re-elected.
| nowrap | 

|-
! 
| Jack Thomas Brinkley
|  | Democratic
| 1966
| Incumbent re-elected.
| nowrap | 

|-
! 
| Benjamin B. Blackburn
|  | Republican
| 1966
|  | Incumbent lost re-election.New member elected.Democratic gain.
| nowrap | 

|-
! 
| Andrew Young
|  | Democratic
| 1972
| Incumbent re-elected.
| nowrap | 

|-
! 
| Jack Flynt
|  | Democratic
| 1954
| Incumbent re-elected.
| nowrap | 

|-
! 
| John W. Davis
|  | Democratic
| 1960
|  | Incumbent lost renomination.New member elected.Democratic hold.
| nowrap | 

|-
! 
| W. S. Stuckey Jr.
|  | Democratic
| 1966
| Incumbent re-elected.
| nowrap | 

|-
! 
| Phillip M. Landrum
|  | Democratic
| 1952
| Incumbent re-elected.
| nowrap | 

|-
! 
| Robert Grier Stephens Jr.
|  | Democratic
| 1960
| Incumbent re-elected.
| nowrap | 

|}

Hawaii 

|-
! 
| Spark Matsunaga
|  | Democratic
| 1962
| Incumbent re-elected.
| nowrap | 

|-
! 
| Patsy Mink
|  | Democratic
| 1964
| Incumbent re-elected.
| nowrap | 

|}

Idaho 

|-
! 
| Steve Symms
|  | Republican
| 1972
| Incumbent re-elected.
| nowrap | 

|-
! 
| Orval H. Hansen
|  | Republican
| 1968
|  | Incumbent lost renomination.New member elected.Republican hold.
| nowrap | 

|}

Illinois 

|-
! 
| Ralph H. Metcalfe
|  | Democratic
| 1970
| Incumbent re-elected.
| nowrap | 

|-
! 
| Morgan F. Murphy
|  | Democratic
| 1970
| Incumbent re-elected.
| nowrap | 

|-
! 
| Robert P. Hanrahan
|  | Republican
| 1972
|  | Incumbent lost re-election.New member elected.Democratic gain.
| nowrap | 

|-
! 
| Ed Derwinski
|  | Republican
| 1958
| Incumbent re-elected.
| nowrap | 

|-
! 
| John C. Kluczynski
|  | Democratic
| 1950
| Incumbent re-elected.
| nowrap | 

|-
! 
| Harold R. Collier
|  | Republican
| 1956
|  | Incumbent retired.New member elected.Republican hold.
| nowrap | 

|-
! 
| Cardiss Collins
|  | Democratic
| 1973 
| Incumbent re-elected.
| nowrap | 

|-
! 
| Dan Rostenkowski
|  | Democratic
| 1958
| Incumbent re-elected.
| nowrap | 

|-
! 
| Sidney R. Yates
|  | Democratic
| 19481962 1964
| Incumbent re-elected.
| nowrap | 

|-
! 
| Samuel H. Young
|  | Republican
| 1972
|  | Incumbent lost re-election.New member elected.Democratic gain.
| nowrap | 

|-
! 
| Frank Annunzio
|  | Democratic
| 1964
| Incumbent re-elected.
| nowrap | 

|-
! 
| Phil Crane
|  | Republican
| 1969 
| Incumbent re-elected.
| nowrap | 

|-
! 
| Robert McClory
|  | Republican
| 1962
| Incumbent re-elected.
| nowrap | 

|-
! 
| John N. Erlenborn
|  | Republican
| 1964
| Incumbent re-elected.
| nowrap | 

|-
! 
| Leslie C. Arends
|  | Republican
| 1934
|  | Incumbent retired.New member elected.Democratic gain.
| nowrap | 

|-
! 
| John B. Anderson
|  | Republican
| 1960
| Incumbent re-elected.
| nowrap | 

|-
! 
| George M. O'Brien
|  | Republican
| 1972
| Incumbent re-elected.
| nowrap | 

|-
! 
| Robert H. Michel
|  | Republican
| 1956
| Incumbent re-elected.
| nowrap | 

|-
! 
| Tom Railsback
|  | Republican
| 1966
| Incumbent re-elected.
| nowrap | 

|-
! 
| Paul Findley
|  | Republican
| 1960
| Incumbent re-elected.
| nowrap | 

|-
! 
| Edward Rell Madigan
|  | Republican
| 1972
| Incumbent re-elected.
| nowrap | 

|-
! 
| George E. Shipley
|  | Democratic
| 1958
| Incumbent re-elected.
| nowrap | 

|-
! 
| Melvin Price
|  | Democratic
| 1944
| Incumbent re-elected.
| nowrap | 

|-
! 
| Kenneth J. Gray
|  | Democratic
| 1954
|  | Incumbent retired.New member elected.Democratic hold.
| nowrap | 

|}

Indiana 

|-
! 
| Ray J. Madden
|  | Democratic
| 1942
| Incumbent re-elected.
| nowrap | 

|-
! 
| Earl F. Landgrebe
|  | Republican
| 1968
|  | Incumbent lost re-election.New member elected.Democratic gain.
| nowrap | 

|-
! 
| John Brademas
|  | Democratic
| 1958
| Incumbent re-elected.
| nowrap | 

|-
! 
| J. Edward Roush
|  | Democratic
| 19581968 1970
| Incumbent re-elected.
| nowrap | 

|-
! 
| Elwood Hillis
|  | Republican
| 1970
| Incumbent re-elected.
| nowrap | 

|-
! 
| William G. Bray
|  | Republican
| 1950
|  | Incumbent lost re-election.New member elected.Democratic gain.
| nowrap | 

|-
! 
| John T. Myers
|  | Republican
| 1966
| Incumbent re-elected.
| nowrap | 

|-
! 
| Roger H. Zion
|  | Republican
| 1966
|  | Incumbent lost re-election.New member elected.Democratic gain.
| nowrap | 

|-
! 
| Lee H. Hamilton
|  | Democratic
| 1964
| Incumbent re-elected.
| nowrap | 

|-
! 
| David W. Dennis
|  | Republican
| 1968
|  | Incumbent lost re-election.New member elected.Democratic gain.
| nowrap | 

|-
! 
| William H. Hudnut III
|  | Republican
| 1972
|  | Incumbent lost re-election.New member elected.Democratic gain.
| nowrap | 

|}

Iowa 

|-
! 
| Edward Mezvinsky
|  | Democratic
| 1972
| Incumbent re-elected.
| nowrap | 

|-
! 
| John C. Culver
|  | Democratic
| 1964
|  | Incumbent retired to run for U.S. senator.New member elected.Democratic hold.
| nowrap | 

|-
! 
| H. R. Gross
|  | Republican
| 1948
|  | Incumbent retired.New member elected.Republican hold.
| nowrap | 

|-
! 
| Neal Smith
|  | Democratic
| 1958
| Incumbent re-elected.
| nowrap | 

|-
! 
| William J. Scherle
|  | Republican
| 1966
|  | Incumbent lost re-election.New member elected.Democratic gain.
| nowrap | 

|-
! 
| Wiley Mayne
|  | Republican
| 1966
|  | Incumbent lost re-election.New member elected.Democratic gain.
| nowrap | 

|}

Kansas 

|-
! 
| Keith Sebelius
|  | Republican
| 1968
| Incumbent re-elected.
| nowrap | 

|-
! 
| William R. Roy
|  | Democratic
| 1970
|  | Incumbent retired to run for U.S. senator.New member elected.Democratic hold.
| nowrap | 

|-
! 
| Larry Winn
|  | Republican
| 1966
| Incumbent re-elected.
| nowrap | 

|-
! 
| Garner E. Shriver
|  | Republican
| 1960
| Incumbent re-elected.
| nowrap | 

|-
! 
| Joe Skubitz
|  | Republican
| 1962
| Incumbent re-elected.
| nowrap | 

|}

Kentucky 

|-
! 
| Frank Stubblefield
|  | Democratic
| 1958
|  | Incumbent lost renomination.New member elected.Democratic hold.
| nowrap | 

|-
! 
| William Natcher
|  | Democratic
| 1953 
| Incumbent re-elected.
| nowrap | 

|-
! 
| Romano L. Mazzoli
|  | Democratic
| 1970
| Incumbent re-elected.
| nowrap | 

|-
! 
| Gene Snyder
|  | Republican
| 19621964 1966
| Incumbent re-elected.
| nowrap | 

|-
! 
| Tim Lee Carter
|  | Republican
| 1964
| Incumbent re-elected.
| nowrap | 

|-
! 
| John B. Breckinridge
|  | Democratic
| 1972
| Incumbent re-elected.
| nowrap | 

|-
! 
| Carl D. Perkins
|  | Democratic
| 1948
| Incumbent re-elected.
| nowrap | 

|}

Louisiana 

|-
! 
| F. Edward Hébert
|  | Democratic
| 1940
| Incumbent re-elected.
| nowrap | 

|-
! 
| Lindy Boggs
|  | Democratic
| 1973 
| Incumbent re-elected.
| nowrap | 

|-
! 
| Dave Treen
|  | Republican
| 1972
| Incumbent re-elected.
| nowrap | 

|-
! 
| Joe Waggonner
|  | Democratic
| 1961 
| Incumbent re-elected.
| nowrap | 

|-
! 
| Otto Passman
|  | Democratic
| 1946
| Incumbent re-elected.
| nowrap | 

|-
! 
| John Rarick
|  | Democratic
| 1966
|  | Incumbent lost renomination.New member elected.Republican gain.
| nowrap | 

|-
! 
| John Breaux
|  | Democratic
| 1972
| Incumbent re-elected.
| nowrap | 

|-
! 
| Gillis William Long
|  | Democratic
| 19621964 1972
| Incumbent re-elected.
| nowrap | 

|}

Maine 

|-
! 
| Peter N. Kyros
|  | Democratic
| 1966
|  | Incumbent lost re-election.New member elected.Republican gain.
| nowrap | 

|-
! 
| William Cohen
|  | Republican
| 1972
| Incumbent re-elected.
| nowrap | 

|}

Maryland 

|-
! 
| Robert Bauman
|  | Republican
| 1973 
| Incumbent re-elected.
| nowrap | 

|-
! 
| Clarence Long
|  | Democratic
| 1962
| Incumbent re-elected.
| nowrap | 

|-
! 
| Paul Sarbanes
|  | Democratic
| 1970
| Incumbent re-elected.
| nowrap | 

|-
! 
| Marjorie Holt
|  | Republican
| 1972
| Incumbent re-elected.
| nowrap | 

|-
! 
| Lawrence Hogan
|  | Republican
| 1968
|  | Incumbent retired to run for Governor of Maryland.New member elected.Democratic gain.
| nowrap | 

|-
! 
| Goodloe Byron
|  | Democratic
| 1970
| Incumbent re-elected.
| nowrap | 

|-
! 
| Parren Mitchell
|  | Democratic
| 1970
| Incumbent re-elected.
| nowrap | 

|-
! 
| Gilbert Gude
|  | Republican
| 1966
| Incumbent re-elected.
| nowrap | 

|}

Massachusetts 

|-
! 
| Silvio Conte
|  | Republican
| 1958
| Incumbent re-elected.
| nowrap | 

|-
! 
| Edward Boland
|  | Democratic
| 1952
| Incumbent re-elected.
| nowrap | 

|-
! 
| Harold Donohue
|  | Democratic
| 1946
|  | Incumbent retired.New member elected.Democratic hold.
| nowrap | 

|-
! 
| Robert Drinan
|  | Democratic
| 1970
| Incumbent re-elected.
| nowrap | 

|-
! 
| Paul W. Cronin
|  | Republican
| 1972
|  | Incumbent lost re-election.New member elected.Democratic gain.
| nowrap | 

|-
! 
| Michael J. Harrington
|  | Democratic
| 1969 
| Incumbent re-elected.
| nowrap | 

|-
! 
| Torbert H. MacDonald
|  | Democratic
| 1954
| Incumbent re-elected.
| nowrap | 

|-
! 
| Tip O'Neill
|  | Democratic
| 1952
| Incumbent re-elected.
| nowrap | 

|-
! 
| Joe Moakley
|  | Democratic
| 1972
| Incumbent re-elected.
| nowrap | 

|-
! 
| Margaret Heckler
|  | Republican
| 1966
| Incumbent re-elected.
| nowrap | 

|-
! 
| James A. Burke
|  | Democratic
| 1958
| Incumbent re-elected.
| nowrap | 

|-
! 
| Gerry E. Studds
|  | Democratic
| 1972
| Incumbent re-elected.
| nowrap | 

|}

Michigan 

|-
! 
| John Conyers Jr.
|  | Democratic
| 1964
| Incumbent re-elected.
| nowrap | 

|-
! 
| Marvin L. Esch
|  | Republican
| 1966
| Incumbent re-elected.
| nowrap | 

|-
! 
| Garry E. Brown
|  | Republican
| 1966
| Incumbent re-elected.
| nowrap | 

|-
! 
| J. Edward Hutchinson
|  | Republican
| 1962
| Incumbent re-elected.
| nowrap | 

|-
! 
| Richard F. Vander Veen
|  | Democratic
| 1974
| Incumbent re-elected.
| nowrap | 

|-
! 
| Charles E. Chamberlain
|  | Republican
| 1956
|  | Incumbent retired.New member elected.Democratic gain.
| nowrap | 

|-
! 
| Donald W. Riegle Jr.
|  | Democratic
| 1966
| Incumbent re-elected.
| nowrap | 

|-
! 
| J. Bob Traxler
|  | Democratic
| 1974
| Incumbent re-elected.
| nowrap | 

|-
! 
| Guy Vander Jagt
|  | Republican
| 1966
| Incumbent re-elected.
| nowrap | 

|-
! 
| Elford Albin Cederberg
|  | Republican
| 1952
| Incumbent re-elected.
| nowrap | 

|-
! 
| Philip Ruppe
|  | Republican
| 1966
| Incumbent re-elected.
| nowrap | 

|-
! 
| James G. O'Hara
|  | Democratic
| 1958
| Incumbent re-elected.
| nowrap | 

|-
! 
| Charles Diggs
|  | Democratic
| 1954
| Incumbent re-elected.
| nowrap | 

|-
! 
| Lucien Nedzi
|  | Democratic
| 1961 
| Incumbent re-elected.
| nowrap | 

|-
! 
| William D. Ford
|  | Democratic
| 1964
| Incumbent re-elected.
| nowrap | 

|-
! 
| John D. Dingell Jr.
|  | Democratic
| 1955 
| Incumbent re-elected.
| nowrap | 

|-
! 
| Martha W. Griffiths
|  | Democratic
| 1954
|  | Incumbent retired.New member elected.Democratic hold.
| nowrap | 

|-
! 
| Robert J. Huber
|  | Republican
| 1972
|  | Incumbent lost re-election.New member elected.Democratic gain.
| nowrap | 

|-
! 
| William Broomfield
|  | Republican
| 1956
| Incumbent re-elected.
| nowrap | 

|}

Minnesota 

|-
! 
| Al Quie
|  | Republican
| 1958
| Incumbent re-elected.
| nowrap | 

|-
! 
| Ancher Nelsen
|  | Republican
| 1958
|  | Incumbent retired.New member elected.Republican hold.
| nowrap | 

|-
! 
| Bill Frenzel
|  | Republican
| 1970
| Incumbent re-elected.
| nowrap | 

|-
! 
| Joseph Karth
|  | 
| 1958
| Incumbent re-elected.
| nowrap | 

|-
! 
| Donald M. Fraser
|  | 
| 1962
| Incumbent re-elected.
| nowrap | 

|-
! 
| John Zwach
|  | Republican
| 1966
|  | Incumbent retired.New member elected. gain.
| nowrap | 

|-
! 
| Bob Bergland
|  | 
| 1970
| Incumbent re-elected.
| nowrap | 

|-
! 
| John Blatnik
|  | 
| 1946
|  | Incumbent retired.New member elected.Democratic hold.
| nowrap | 

|}

Mississippi 

|-
! 
| Jamie Whitten
|  | Democratic
| 1941 
| Incumbent re-elected.
| nowrap | 

|-
! 
| David R. Bowen
|  | Democratic
| 1972
| Incumbent re-elected.
| nowrap | 

|-
! 
| Gillespie V. Montgomery
|  | Democratic
| 1966
| Incumbent re-elected.
| nowrap | 

|-
! 
| Thad Cochran
|  | Republican
| 1972
| Incumbent re-elected.
| nowrap | 

|-
! 
| Trent Lott
|  | Republican
| 1972
| Incumbent re-elected.
| nowrap | 

|}

Missouri 

|-
! 
| Bill Clay
|  | Democratic
| 1968
| Incumbent re-elected.
| nowrap | 

|-
! 
| James W. Symington
|  | Democratic
| 1968
| Incumbent re-elected.
| nowrap | 

|-
! 
| Leonor Sullivan
|  | Democratic
| 1952
| Incumbent re-elected.
| nowrap | 

|-
! 
| William J. Randall
|  | Democratic
| 1959 
| Incumbent re-elected.
| nowrap | 

|-
! 
| Richard Bolling
|  | Democratic
| 1948
| Incumbent re-elected.
| nowrap | 

|-
! 
| Jerry Litton
|  | Democratic
| 1972
| Incumbent re-elected.
| nowrap | 

|-
! 
| Gene Taylor
|  | Republican
| 1972
| Incumbent re-elected.
| nowrap | 

|-
! 
| Richard Howard Ichord Jr.
|  | Democratic
| 1960
| Incumbent re-elected.
| nowrap | 

|-
! 
| William L. Hungate
|  | Democratic
| 1964
| Incumbent re-elected.
| nowrap | 

|-
! 
| Bill Burlison
|  | Democratic
| 1968
| Incumbent re-elected.
| nowrap | 

|}

Montana 

|-
! 
| Richard G. Shoup
|  | Republican
| 1970
|  | Incumbent lost re-election.New member elected.Democratic gain.
| nowrap | 

|-
! 
| John Melcher
|  | Democratic
| 1969 
| Incumbent re-elected.
| nowrap | 

|}

Nebraska 

|-
! 
| Charles Thone
|  | Republican
| 1970
| Incumbent re-elected.
| nowrap | 

|-
! 
| John Y. McCollister
|  | Republican
| 1970
| Incumbent re-elected.
| nowrap | 

|-
! 
| David T. Martin
|  | Republican
| 1960
|  | Incumbent retired.New member elected.Republican hold.
| nowrap | 

|}

Nevada 

|-
! 
| David Towell
|  | Republican
| 1972
|  | Incumbent lost re-election.New member elected.Democratic gain.
| nowrap | 

|}

New Hampshire 

|-
! 
| Louis C. Wyman
|  | Republican
| 19621964 1966
|  | Incumbent retired to run for U.S. senator.New member elected.Democratic gain.
| nowrap | 

|-
! 
| James Colgate Cleveland
|  | Republican
| 1962
| Incumbent re-elected.
| nowrap | 

|}

New Jersey 

|-
! 
| John E. Hunt
|  | Republican
| 1966
|  | Incumbent lost re-election.New member elected.Democratic gain.
| nowrap | 

|-
! 
| Charles W. Sandman Jr.
|  | Republican
| 1966
|  | Incumbent lost re-election.New member elected.Democratic gain.
| nowrap | 

|-
! 
| James J. Howard
|  | Democratic
| 1964
| Incumbent re-elected.
| nowrap | 

|-
! 
| Frank Thompson
|  | Democratic
| 1954
| Incumbent re-elected.
| nowrap | 

|-
! 
| Peter Frelinghuysen Jr.
|  | Republican
| 1952
|  | Incumbent retired.New member elected.Republican hold.
| nowrap | 

|-
! 
| Edwin B. Forsythe
|  | Republican
| 1970
| Incumbent re-elected.
| nowrap | 

|-
! 
| William B. Widnall
|  | Republican
| 1950
|  | Incumbent lost re-election.New member elected.Democratic gain.
| nowrap | 

|-
! 
| Robert A. Roe
|  | Democratic
| 1970
| Incumbent re-elected.
| nowrap | 

|-
! 
| Henry Helstoski
|  | Democratic
| 1964
| Incumbent re-elected.
| nowrap | 

|-
! 
| Peter W. Rodino
|  | Democratic
| 1948
| Incumbent re-elected.
| nowrap | 

|-
! 
| Joseph G. Minish
|  | Democratic
| 1962
| Incumbent re-elected.
| nowrap | 

|-
! 
| Matthew John Rinaldo
|  | Republican
| 1972
| Incumbent re-elected.
| nowrap | 

|-
! 
| Joseph J. Maraziti
|  | Republican
| 1972
|  | Incumbent lost re-election.New member elected.Democratic gain.
| nowrap | 

|-
! 
| Dominick V. Daniels
|  | Democratic
| 1958
| Incumbent re-elected.
| nowrap | 

|-
! 
| Edward J. Patten
|  | Democratic
| 1962
| Incumbent re-elected.
| nowrap | 

|}

New Mexico 

|-
! 
| Manuel Lujan Jr.
|  | Republican
| 1968
| Incumbent re-elected.
| 

|-
! 
| Harold L. Runnels
|  | Democratic
| 1970
| Incumbent re-elected.
| 

|}

New York 

|-
! 
| Otis G. Pike
|  | Democratic
| 1960
| Incumbent re-elected.
| nowrap | 

|-
! 
| James R. Grover Jr.
|  | Republican
| 1962
|  | Incumbent lost re-election.New member elected.Democratic gain.
| nowrap | 

|-
! 
| Angelo D. Roncallo
|  | Republican
| 1972
|  | Incumbent lost re-election.New member elected.Democratic gain.
| nowrap | 

|-
! 
| Norman F. Lent
|  | Republican
| 1970
| Incumbent re-elected.
| nowrap | 

|-
! 
| John W. Wydler
|  | Republican
| 1962
| Incumbent re-elected.
| nowrap | 

|-
! 
| Lester L. Wolff
|  | Democratic
| 1964
| Incumbent re-elected.
| nowrap | 

|-
! 
| Joseph P. Addabbo
|  | Democratic
| 1960
| Incumbent re-elected.
| nowrap | 

|-
! 
| Benjamin Stanley Rosenthal
|  | Democratic
| 1962
| Incumbent re-elected.
| nowrap | 

|-
! 
| James J. Delaney
|  | Democratic
| 19441946 1948
| Incumbent re-elected.
| nowrap | 

|-
! 
| Mario Biaggi
|  | Democratic
| 1968
| Incumbent re-elected.
| nowrap | 

|-
! 
| Frank J. Brasco
|  | Democratic
| 1966
|  | Incumbent retired.New member elected.Democratic hold.
| nowrap | 

|-
! 
| Shirley Chisholm
|  | Democratic
| 1968
| Incumbent re-elected.
| nowrap | 

|-
! 
| Bertram L. Podell
|  | Democratic
| 1968
|  | Incumbent lost renomination.New member elected.Democratic hold.
| nowrap | 

|-
! 
| John J. Rooney
|  | Democratic
| 1944
|  | Incumbent retired.New member elected.Democratic hold.
| nowrap | 

|-
! 
| Hugh L. Carey
|  | Democratic
| 1960
|  | Incumbent retired to run for Governor of New York.New member elected.Democratic hold.
| nowrap | 

|-
! 
| Elizabeth Holtzman
|  | Democratic
| 1972
| Incumbent re-elected.
| nowrap | 

|-
! 
| John M. Murphy
|  | Democratic
| 1962
| Incumbent re-elected.
| nowrap | 

|-
! 
| Ed Koch
|  | Democratic
| 1968
| Incumbent re-elected.
| nowrap | 

|-
! 
| Charles B. Rangel
|  | Democratic
| 1970
| Incumbent re-elected.
| nowrap | 

|-
! 
| Bella Abzug
|  | Democratic
| 1970
| Incumbent re-elected.
| nowrap | 

|-
! 
| Herman Badillo
|  | Democratic
| 1970
| Incumbent re-elected.
| nowrap | 

|-
! 
| Jonathan Brewster Bingham
|  | Democratic
| 1964
| Incumbent re-elected.
| nowrap | 

|-
! 
| Peter A. Peyser
|  | Republican
| 1970
| Incumbent re-elected.
| nowrap | 

|-
! 
| Ogden R. Reid
|  | Democratic
| 1962
|  | Incumbent retired to run for Governor of New York.New member elected.Democratic hold.
| nowrap | 

|-
! 
| Hamilton Fish IV
|  | Republican
| 1968
| Incumbent re-elected.
| nowrap | 

|-
! 
| Benjamin A. Gilman
|  | Republican
| 1972
| Incumbent re-elected.
| nowrap | 

|-
! 
| Howard W. Robison
|  | Republican
| 1958
|  | Incumbent retired.New member elected.Democratic gain.
| nowrap | 

|-
! 
| Samuel S. Stratton
|  | Democratic
| 1958
| Incumbent re-elected.
| nowrap | 

|-
! 
| Carleton J. King
|  | Republican
| 1960
|  | Incumbent lost re-election.New member elected.Democratic gain.
| nowrap | 

|-
! 
| Robert C. McEwen
|  | Republican
| 1964
| Incumbent re-elected.
| nowrap | 

|-
! 
| Donald J. Mitchell
|  | Republican
| 1972
| Incumbent re-elected.
| nowrap | 

|-
! 
| James M. Hanley
|  | Democratic
| 1964
| Incumbent re-elected.
| nowrap | 

|-
! 
| William F. Walsh
|  | Republican
| 1972
| Incumbent re-elected.
| nowrap | 

|-
! 
| Frank Horton
|  | Republican
| 1962
| Incumbent re-elected.
| nowrap | 

|-
! 
| Barber Conable
|  | Republican
| 1964
| Incumbent re-elected.
| nowrap | 

|-
! 
| Henry P. Smith III
|  | Republican
| 1964
|  | Incumbent retired.New member elected.Democratic gain.
| nowrap | 

|-
! 
| Thaddeus J. Dulski
|  | Democratic
| 1958
|  | Incumbent retired.New member elected.Democratic hold.
| nowrap | 

|-
! 
| Jack Kemp
|  | Republican
| 1970
| Incumbent re-elected.
| nowrap | 

|-
! 
| James F. Hastings
|  | Republican
| 1968
| Incumbent re-elected.
| nowrap | 

|}

North Carolina 

|-
! 
| Walter B. Jones Sr.
|  | Democratic
| 1966
| Incumbent re-elected.
| nowrap | 

|-
! 
| Lawrence H. Fountain
|  | Democratic
| 1952
| Incumbent re-elected.
| nowrap | 

|-
! 
| David N. Henderson
|  | Democratic
| 1960
| Incumbent re-elected.
| nowrap | 

|-
! 
| Ike Franklin Andrews
|  | Democratic
| 1972
| Incumbent re-elected.
| nowrap | 

|-
! 
| Wilmer Mizell
|  | Republican
| 1968
|  | Incumbent lost re-election.New member elected.Democratic gain.
| nowrap | 

|-
! 
| L. Richardson Preyer
|  | Democratic
| 1968
| Incumbent re-elected.
| nowrap | 

|-
! 
| Charlie Rose
|  | Democratic
| 1972
| Incumbent re-elected.
| nowrap | 

|-
! 
| Earl B. Ruth
|  | Republican
| 1968
|  | Incumbent lost re-election.New member elected.Democratic gain.
| nowrap | 

|-
! 
| James G. Martin
|  | Republican
| 1972
| Incumbent re-elected.
| nowrap | 

|-
! 
| James T. Broyhill
|  | Republican
| 1962
| Incumbent re-elected.
| nowrap | 

|-
! 
| Roy A. Taylor
|  | Democratic
| 1960
| Incumbent re-elected.
| nowrap | 

|}

North Dakota 

|-
! 
| Mark Andrews
|  | Republican
| 1963 
| Incumbent re-elected.
| nowrap | 

|}

Ohio 

|-
! 
| Tom Luken
|  | Democratic
| 1974
|  | Incumbent lost re-election.New member elected.Republican gain.
| nowrap | 

|-
! 
| Donald D. Clancy
|  | Republican
| 1960
| Incumbent re-elected.
| nowrap | 

|-
! 
| Charles W. Whalen Jr.
|  | Republican
| 1966
| Incumbent re-elected.
| nowrap | 

|-
! 
| Tennyson Guyer
|  | Republican
| 1972
| Incumbent re-elected.
| nowrap | 

|-
! 
| Del Latta
|  | Republican
| 1958
| Incumbent re-elected.
| nowrap | 

|-
! 
| Bill Harsha
|  | Republican
| 1960
| Incumbent re-elected.
| nowrap | 

|-
! 
| Bud Brown
|  | Republican
| 1965 
| Incumbent re-elected.
| nowrap | 

|-
! 
| Walter E. Powell
|  | Republican
| 1970
|  | Incumbent retired.New member elected.Republican hold.
| nowrap | 

|-
! 
| Thomas L. Ashley
|  | Democratic
| 1954
| Incumbent re-elected.
| nowrap | 

|-
! 
| Clarence E. Miller
|  | Republican
| 1966
| Incumbent re-elected.
| nowrap | 

|-
! 
| J. William Stanton
|  | Republican
| 1964
| Incumbent re-elected.
| nowrap | 

|-
! 
| Samuel L. Devine
|  | Republican
| 1958
| Incumbent re-elected.
| nowrap | 

|-
! 
| Charles Adams Mosher
|  | Republican
| 1960
| Incumbent re-elected.
| nowrap | 

|-
! 
| John F. Seiberling
|  | Democratic
| 1970
| Incumbent re-elected.
| nowrap | 

|-
! 
| Chalmers P. Wylie
|  | Republican
| 1966
| Incumbent re-elected.
| nowrap | 

|-
! 
| Ralph Regula
|  | Republican
| 1972
| Incumbent re-elected.
| nowrap | 

|-
! 
| John M. Ashbrook
|  | Republican
| 1960
| Incumbent re-elected.
| nowrap | 

|-
! 
| Wayne L. Hays
|  | Democratic
| 1948
| Incumbent re-elected.
| nowrap | 

|-
! 
| Charles J. Carney
|  | Democratic
| 1970
| Incumbent re-elected.
| nowrap | 

|-
! 
| James V. Stanton
|  | Democratic
| 1970
| Incumbent re-elected.
| nowrap | 

|-
! 
| Louis Stokes
|  | Democratic
| 1968
| Incumbent re-elected.
| nowrap | 

|-
! 
| Charles Vanik
|  | Democratic
| 1954
| Incumbent re-elected.
| nowrap | 

|-
! 
| William Edwin Minshall Jr.
|  | Republican
| 1954
|  | Incumbent retired.New member elected.Democratic gain.
| nowrap | 

|}

Oklahoma 

|-
! 
| James R. Jones
|  | Democratic
| 1972
| Incumbent re-elected.
| nowrap | 

|-
! 
| Clem McSpadden
|  | Democratic
| 1972
|  | Incumbent retired to run for Governor of Oklahoma.New member elected.Democratic hold.
| nowrap | 

|-
! 
| Carl Albert
|  | Democratic
| 1946
| Incumbent re-elected.
| nowrap | 

|-
! 
| Tom Steed
|  | Democratic
| 1948
| Incumbent re-elected.
| nowrap | 

|-
! 
| John Jarman
|  | Democratic
| 1950
| Incumbent re-elected.
| nowrap | 

|-
! 
| John Newbold Camp
|  | Republican
| 1968
|  | Incumbent lost re-election.New member elected.Democratic gain.
| nowrap | 

|}

Oregon 

|-
! 
| Wendell Wyatt
|  | Republican
| 1964
|  | Incumbent retired.New member elected.Democratic gain.
| nowrap | 

|-
! 
| Albert C. Ullman
|  | Democratic
| 1956
| Incumbent re-elected.
| nowrap | 

|-
! 
| Edith Green
|  | Democratic
| 1954
|  | Incumbent retired.New member elected.Democratic hold.
| nowrap | 

|-
! 
| John R. Dellenback
|  | Republican
| 1966
|  | Incumbent lost re-election.New member elected.Democratic gain.
| nowrap | 

|}

Pennsylvania 

|-
! 
| William A. Barrett
|  | Democratic
| 19441946 1948
| Incumbent re-elected.
| nowrap | 

|-
! 
| Robert N. C. Nix Sr.
|  | Democratic
| 1958
| Incumbent re-elected.
| nowrap | 

|-
! 
| William J. Green III
|  | Democratic
| 1964
| Incumbent re-elected.
| nowrap | 

|-
! 
| Joshua Eilberg
|  | Democratic
| 1966
| Incumbent re-elected.
| nowrap | 

|-
! 
| John H. Ware III
|  | Republican
| 1970
|  | Incumbent retired.New member elected.Republican hold.
| nowrap | 

|-
! 
| Gus Yatron
|  | Democratic
| 1968
| Incumbent re-elected.
| nowrap | 

|-
! 
| Lawrence G. Williams
|  | Republican
| 1966
|  | Incumbent lost renomination.New member elected.Democratic gain.
| nowrap | 

|-
! 
| Edward G. Biester Jr.
|  | Republican
| 1966
| Incumbent re-elected.
| nowrap | 

|-
! 
| Bud Shuster
|  | Republican
| 1972
| Incumbent re-elected.
| nowrap | 

|-
! 
| Joseph M. McDade
|  | Republican
| 1962
| Incumbent re-elected.
| nowrap | 

|-
! 
| Daniel J. Flood
|  | Democratic
| 19441946 19481952 1954
| Incumbent re-elected.
| nowrap | 

|-
! 
| John Murtha
|  | Democratic
| 1974
| Incumbent re-elected.
| nowrap | 

|-
! 
| R. Lawrence Coughlin
|  | Republican
| 1968
| Incumbent re-elected.
| nowrap | 

|-
! 
| William S. Moorhead
|  | Democratic
| 1958
| Incumbent re-elected.
| nowrap | 

|-
! 
| Fred B. Rooney
|  | Democratic
| 1963 
| Incumbent re-elected.
| nowrap | 

|-
! 
| Edwin D. Eshleman
|  | Republican
| 1966
| Incumbent re-elected.
| nowrap | 

|-
! 
| Herman T. Schneebeli
|  | Republican
| 1960
| Incumbent re-elected.
| nowrap | 

|-
! 
| H. John Heinz III
|  | Republican
| 1971 
| Incumbent re-elected.
| nowrap | 

|-
! 
| George Atlee Goodling
|  | Republican
| 19601964 1966
|  | Incumbent retired.New member elected.Republican hold.
| nowrap | 

|-
! 
| Joseph M. Gaydos
|  | Democratic
| 1968
| Incumbent re-elected.
| nowrap | 

|-
! 
| John H. Dent
|  | Democratic
| 1958
| Incumbent re-elected.
| nowrap | 

|-
! 
| Thomas E. Morgan
|  | Democratic
| 1944
| Incumbent re-elected.
| nowrap | 

|-
! 
| Albert W. Johnson
|  | Republican
| 1963 
| Incumbent re-elected.
| nowrap | 

|-
! 
| Joseph P. Vigorito
|  | Democratic
| 1964
| Incumbent re-elected.
| nowrap | 

|-
! 
| Frank M. Clark
|  | Democratic
| 1954
|  | Incumbent lost re-election.New member elected.Republican gain.
| nowrap | 

|}

Rhode Island 

|-
! 
| Fernand St. Germain
|  | Democratic
| 1960
| Incumbent re-elected.
| nowrap | 

|-
! 
| Robert Tiernan
|  | Democratic
| 1967 
|  | Incumbent lost renomination.New member elected.Democratic hold.
| nowrap | 

|}

South Carolina 

|-
! 
| Mendel Jackson Davis
|  | Democratic
| 1971 
| Incumbent re-elected.
| nowrap | 

|-
! 
| Floyd Spence
|  | Republican
| 1970
| Incumbent re-elected.
| nowrap | 

|-
! 
| William Jennings Bryan Dorn
|  | Democratic
| 19461948 1950
|  | Incumbent retired to run for Governor of South Carolina.New member elected.Democratic hold.
| nowrap | 

|-
! 
| James R. Mann
|  | Democratic
| 1968
| Incumbent re-elected.
| nowrap | 

|-
! 
| Thomas S. Gettys
|  | Democratic
| 1964
|  | Incumbent retired.New member elected.Democratic hold.
| nowrap | 

|-
! 
| Edward Lunn Young
|  | Republican
| 1972
|  | Incumbent lost re-election.New member elected.Democratic gain.
| nowrap | 

|}

South Dakota 

|-
! 
| Frank E. Denholm
|  | Democratic
| 1970
|  | Incumbent lost re-election.New member elected.Republican gain.
| nowrap | 

|-
! 
| James Abdnor
|  | Republican
| 1972
| Incumbent re-elected.
| nowrap | 

|}

Tennessee 

|-
! 
| Jimmy Quillen
|  | Republican
| 1962
| Incumbent re-elected.
| nowrap | 

|-
! 
| John Duncan Sr.
|  | Republican
| 1964
| Incumbent re-elected.
| nowrap | 

|-
! 
| LaMar Baker
|  | Republican
| 1970
|  | Incumbent lost re-election.New member elected.Democratic gain.
| nowrap | 

|-
! 
| Joe L. Evins
|  | Democratic
| 1946
| Incumbent re-elected.
| nowrap | 

|-
! 
| Richard Fulton
|  | Democratic
| 1962
| Incumbent re-elected.
| nowrap | 

|-
! 
| Robin Beard
|  | Republican
| 1972
| Incumbent re-elected.
| nowrap | 

|-
! 
| Ed Jones
|  | Democratic
| 1969 
| Incumbent re-elected.
| nowrap | 

|-
! 
| Dan Kuykendall
|  | Republican
| 1966
|  | Incumbent lost re-election.New member elected.Democratic gain.
| nowrap | 

|}

Texas 

|-
! 
| Wright Patman
|  | Democratic
| 1928
| Incumbent re-elected.
| nowrap | 

|-
! 
| Charles Wilson
|  | Democratic
| 1972
| Incumbent re-elected.
| nowrap | 

|-
! 
| James M. Collins
|  | Republican
| 1968
| Incumbent re-elected.
| nowrap | 

|-
! 
| Ray Roberts
|  | Democratic
| 1962
| Incumbent re-elected.
| nowrap | 

|-
! 
| Alan Steelman
|  | Republican
| 1972
| Incumbent re-elected.
| nowrap | 

|-
! 
| Olin E. Teague
|  | Democratic
| 1946
| Incumbent re-elected.
| nowrap | 

|-
! 
| William Reynolds Archer Jr.
|  | Republican
| 1970
| Incumbent re-elected.
| nowrap | 

|-
! 
| Robert C. Eckhardt
|  | Democratic
| 1966
| Incumbent re-elected.
| nowrap | 

|-
! 
| Jack Brooks
|  | Democratic
| 1952
| Incumbent re-elected.
| nowrap | 

|-
! 
| J. J. Pickle
|  | Democratic
| 1963 
| Incumbent re-elected.
| nowrap | 

|-
! 
| William R. Poage
|  | Democratic
| 1936
| Incumbent re-elected.
| nowrap | 

|-
! 
| Jim Wright
|  | Democratic
| 1954
| Incumbent re-elected.
| nowrap | 

|-
! 
| Robert Price
|  | Republican
| 1966
|  | Incumbent lost re-election.New member elected.Democratic gain.
| nowrap | 

|-
! 
| John Andrew Young
|  | Democratic
| 1956
| Incumbent re-elected.
| nowrap | 

|-
! 
| Kika de la Garza
|  | Democratic
| 1964
| Incumbent re-elected.
| nowrap | 

|-
! 
| Richard Crawford White
|  | Democratic
| 1964
| Incumbent re-elected.
| nowrap | 

|-
! 
| Omar Burleson
|  | Democratic
| 1946
| Incumbent re-elected.
| nowrap | 

|-
! 
| Barbara Jordan
|  | Democratic
| 1972
| Incumbent re-elected.
| nowrap | 

|-
! 
| George H. Mahon
|  | Democratic
| 1934
| Incumbent re-elected.
| nowrap | 

|-
! 
| Henry B. González
|  | Democratic
| 1961 
| Incumbent re-elected.
| nowrap | 

|-
! 
| O. C. Fisher
|  | Democratic
| 1942
|  | Incumbent retired.New member elected.Democratic hold.
| nowrap | 

|-
! 
| Robert R. Casey
|  | Democratic
| 1958
| Incumbent re-elected.
| nowrap | 

|-
! 
| Abraham Kazen
|  | Democratic
| 1966
| Incumbent re-elected.
| nowrap | 

|-
! 
| Dale Milford
|  | Democratic
| 1972
| Incumbent re-elected.
| nowrap | 

|}

Utah 

|-
! 
| K. Gunn McKay
|  | Democratic
| 1970
| Incumbent re-elected.
| nowrap | 

|-
! 
| Douglas W. Owens
|  | Democratic
| 1972
|  | Incumbent retired to run for U.S. senator.New member elected.Democratic hold.
| nowrap | 

|}

Vermont 

|-
! 
| Richard W. Mallary
|  | Republican
| 1972 
|  | Incumbent retired to run for U.S. senator.New member elected.Republican hold.
| nowrap | 

|}

Virginia 

|-
! 
| Thomas N. Downing
|  | Democratic
| 1958
| Incumbent re-elected.
| nowrap | 

|-
! 
| G. William Whitehurst
|  | Republican
| 1968
| Incumbent re-elected.
| nowrap | 

|-
! 
| David E. Satterfield III
|  | Democratic
| 1964
| Incumbent re-elected.
| nowrap | 

|-
! 
| Robert Daniel
|  | Republican
| 1972
| Incumbent re-elected.
| nowrap | 

|-
! 
| Dan Daniel
|  | Democratic
| 1968
| Incumbent re-elected.
| nowrap | 

|-
! 
| M. Caldwell Butler
|  | Republican
| 1972
| Incumbent re-elected.
| nowrap | 

|-
! 
| J. Kenneth Robinson
|  | Republican
| 1970
| Incumbent re-elected.
| nowrap | 

|-
! 
| Stanford Parris
|  | Republican
| 1972
|  | Incumbent lost re-election.New member elected.Democratic gain.
| nowrap | 

|-
! 
| William C. Wampler
|  | Republican
| 19521954 1966
| Incumbent re-elected.
| nowrap | 

|-
! 
| Joel T. Broyhill
|  | Republican
| 1952
|  | Incumbent lost re-election.New member elected.Democratic gain.
| nowrap | 

|}

Washington 

|-
! 
| Joel Pritchard
|  | Republican
| 1972
| Incumbent re-elected.
| nowrap | 

|-
! 
| Lloyd Meeds
|  | Democratic
| 1964
| Incumbent re-elected.
| nowrap | 

|-
! 
| Julia Butler Hansen
|  | Democratic
| 1960
|  | Incumbent retired.New member elected.Democratic hold.
| nowrap | 

|-
! 
| Mike McCormack
|  | Democratic
| 1970
| Incumbent re-elected.
| nowrap | 

|-
! 
| Tom Foley
|  | Democratic
| 1964
| Incumbent re-elected.
| nowrap | 

|-
! 
| Floyd Verne Hicks
|  | Democratic
| 1964
| Incumbent re-elected.
| nowrap | 

|-
! 
| Brock Adams
|  | Democratic
| 1964
| Incumbent re-elected.
| nowrap | 

|}

West Virginia 

|-
! 
| Bob Mollohan
|  | Democratic
| 19521956 1968
| Incumbent re-elected.
| nowrap | 

|-
! 
| Harley O. Staggers
|  | Democratic
| 1948
| Incumbent re-elected.
| nowrap | 

|-
! 
| John M. Slack Jr.
|  | Democratic
| 1958
| Incumbent re-elected.
| nowrap | 

|-
! 
| Ken Hechler
|  | Democratic
| 1958
| Incumbent re-elected.
| nowrap | 

|}

Wisconsin 

|-
! 
| Les Aspin
|  | Democratic
| 1970
| Incumbent re-elected.
| nowrap | 

|-
! 
| Robert W. Kastenmeier
|  | Democratic
| 1958
| Incumbent re-elected.
| nowrap | 

|-
! 
| Vernon Wallace Thomson
|  | Republican
| 1960
|  | Incumbent lost re-election.New member elected.Democratic gain.
| nowrap | 

|-
! 
| Clement J. Zablocki
|  | Democratic
| 1948
| Incumbent re-elected.
| nowrap | 

|-
! 
| Henry S. Reuss
|  | Democratic
| 1954
| Incumbent re-elected.
| nowrap | 

|-
! 
| William A. Steiger
|  | Republican
| 1966
| Incumbent re-elected.
| nowrap | 

|-
! 
| Dave Obey
|  | Democratic
| 1969 
| Incumbent re-elected.
| nowrap | 

|-
! 
| Harold Vernon Froehlich
|  | Republican
| 1972
|  | Incumbent lost re-election.New member elected.Democratic gain.
| nowrap | 

|-
! 
| Glenn Robert Davis
|  | Republican
| 1947 1956 1964
|  | Incumbent lost renomination.New member elected.Republican hold.
| nowrap | 

|}

Wyoming 

|-
! 
| Teno Roncalio
|  | Democratic
| 19641966 1970
| Incumbent re-elected.
| nowrap | 

|}

See also
 1974 United States elections
 1974 United States gubernatorial elections
 1974 United States Senate elections
 93rd United States Congress
 94th United States Congress
 Watergate Babies
 Watergate scandal

References